Ingo Appelt (born 1961) is an Austrian bobsledder.

Ingo Appelt may also refer to:

 Ingo Appelt (comedian) (born 1967), German comedian